The 1966 Canadian Grand Prix was a motor race held at Mosport Park on September 24, 1966, held for sports cars eligible to Can-Am Series regulations and had 30 starters. It was the sixth Canadian Grand Prix and like all previous races was a sports car race. The race doubled as round three of the 1966 Can-Am Series. The race was won by Penske driver Mark Donohue by two laps over Chaparral driver Phil Hill.

Classification 
Results as follows:

References

Grand Prix
Canadian Grand Prix
Canadian Grand Prix, 1966